Andrea Lee  (born February 11, 1989) is an American kickboxer and mixed martial artist who competes in the flyweight division. She is currently signed with UFC. As of March 7, 2023, she is #11 in the UFC women's flyweight rankings.

Mixed martial arts career

Invicta FC & Legacy Fighting

Andrea Lee's first opponent in her Invicta FC debut was Shannon Sinn, a fight in which she won by unanimous decision. Andrea's next opponent was the more experienced Roxanne Modafferi, who defeated her in a close split decision. Lee bounced back by defeating Rachael Ostovich at Invicta FC 14: Evinger vs. Kianzad via armbar submission with seconds left in the fight. Lee then fought for Legacy FC where she defeated Ariel Beck to become the Legacy FC Flyweight Champion. In 2016, Lee fought again for Invicta where she was submitted by Sarah D'Alelio. She was subsequently suspended for nine months due to a positive drug test for a diuretic.

Lee would make her return to Invicta at the beginning of 2017 with a quick knockout victory over Jenny Liou. The following month, she defeated Heather Bassett to become the inaugural LFA women's flyweight champion. Lee followed up with a decision win over Liz Tracy in Invicta and a successful LFA title defense over Jamie Thorton in her fourth fight of the year.

Ultimate Fighting Championships
In September 2017, Lee signed with the UFC initially to make her promotional debut just two weeks after her last fight. She was expected to face Kalindra Faria at UFC 216 but within hours of the bout announcement she was pulled from the card due to a clause in the UFC Anti Doping Policy which requires fighters with prior violations to serve a 6-month period in the testing pool prior to competing.

Lee faced Veronica Macedo on May 19, 2018, at UFC Fight Night 129. She won the fight by unanimous decision.  This win earned her the Fight of the Night bonus.

Lee was expected to face Jessica-Rose Clark on December 15, 2018, at UFC on Fox 31. However, Clark was forced out of the bout as she was hospitalized due to weight cutting issue and deemed medically unfit to compete by UFC physicians. As a result, the bout was cancelled.

Lee faced Ashlee Evans-Smith on February 17, 2019, at UFC on ESPN 1. She won the fight by unanimous decision.

Lee faced Montana De La Rosa on June 22, 2019, at UFC Fight Night 154. She won the fight by unanimous decision.

Lee faced Joanne Calderwood  at September 9 at UFC 242. She lost the fight via split decision.

Lee faced Lauren Murphy on February 8, 2020, at UFC 247. She lost the fight via controversial split decision. 12 out of 12 MMA media outlets scored the contest for Lee with none scoring it for Murphy.

Lee faced Roxanne Modafferi on September 12, 2020, at UFC Fight Night 177. She lost the fight via unanimous decision.

Lee was scheduled to face Gillian Robertson on December 12, 2020, at UFC 256. However, Lee pulled out in early December due to a broken nose.

Lee faced Antonina Shevchenko on May 15, 2021, at UFC 262. She won the bout via triangle armbar at the end of the second round.

Lee was scheduled to face  Jessica Eye on November 13, 2021, at UFC Fight Night 197. However, Eye pulled out of the bout in mid-October citing illness and was replaced by Cynthia Calvillo. Lee won the fight via technical knockout in round two. This win earned her the Performance of the Night award.

Lee faced Viviane Araújo on May 14, 2022, at UFC on ESPN 36. She lost the bout via unanimous decision.

Lee is scheduled to face Maycee Barber on March 25, 2023, at UFC on ESPN 43.

Championships and awards

Mixed martial arts 
 Ultimate Fighting Championship
 Fight of the Night (One time) vs. Veronica Macedo
 Performance of the night (One time) 
 Legacy Fighting Alliance
 2017 – LFA Women's Flyweight Champion (inaugural)
 One successful title defense
 2016 – Legacy FC professional women’s flyweight Champion (inaugural)
 2014 – Legacy FC Amateur Flyweight Champion (inaugural)
 Ascend Combat
 2013 – Ascend Combat Amateur Flyweight Champion

Kickboxing 
 2014 – International Kickboxing Federation (IKF) World Classic Amateur Featherweight Muay Thai Champion
 2014 – TBA Amateur World Open Lightweight Muay Thai Champion
 2014 – WKA Amateur North American Kickboxing Champion
 2014 – WKA Amateur North American Muay Thai Champion
 2013 – International Kickboxing Federation (IKF) World Classic Amateur Muay Thai Champion

Boxing 
 2013 – Amateur National Golden Gloves Champion
 2013 – Louisiana State Golden Gloves Champion
 2010 – Louisiana State Golden Gloves Champion

Personal life 
Lee's moniker, KGB, was given by her coach as he thought she looked Russian. On one occasion at the Muay Thai World Championships, where Lee secured a victory, the entire Russian team approached her to have pictures taken due to the "KGB" patch on her trunks.

A police report was filed on August 5, 2018, concerning  an abuse by Lee's husband, Donny Aaron. Aaron, who created controversy with his Nazi tattoos, was arrested and jailed on May 30, 2019, after nine months on the run, for domestic violence and false imprisonment after burning Andrea with a cigarette and choking her.

Mixed martial arts record

|-
|Loss
|align=center|13–6
|Viviane Araújo 
|Decision (unanimous)
|UFC on ESPN: Błachowicz vs. Rakić 
| 
|align=center|3
|align=center|5:00
|Las Vegas, Nevada, United States
|
|-
|Win
|align=center|13–5
|Cynthia Calvillo
|TKO (corner stoppage)
|UFC Fight Night: Holloway vs. Rodríguez
|
|align=center|2
|align=center|5:00
|Las Vegas, Nevada, United States
|
|-
|Win
|align=center|12–5
|Antonina Shevchenko
|Submission (triangle armbar)
|UFC 262 
|
|align=center|2
|align=center|4:52
|Houston, Texas, United States
|
|-
|Loss
|align=center|11–5
|Roxanne Modafferi
|Decision (unanimous)
|UFC Fight Night: Waterson vs. Hill
|
|align=center|3
|align=center|5:00
|Las Vegas, Nevada, United States
|
|-
|Loss
|align=center|11–4
|Lauren Murphy
|Decision (split)
|UFC 247 
|
|align=center|3
|align=center|5:00
|Houston, Texas, United States
|
|-
|Loss
|align=center|11–3
|Joanne Calderwood
|Decision (split)
|UFC 242 
|
|align=center|3
|align=center|5:00
|Abu Dhabi, United Arab Emirates
|
|-
|Win
|align=center|11–2
|Montana De La Rosa
|Decision (unanimous)
|UFC Fight Night: Moicano vs. Korean Zombie 
|
|align=center|3
|align=center|5:00
|Greenville, South Carolina, United States
|
|-
|Win
|align=center|10–2
|Ashlee Evans-Smith
|Decision (unanimous)
|UFC on ESPN: Ngannou vs. Velasquez 
|
|align=center|3
|align=center|5:00
|Phoenix, Arizona, United States
|
|-
|Win
|align=center| 9–2
|Veronica Macedo
|Decision (unanimous)
|UFC Fight Night: Maia vs. Usman
|
|align=center|3
|align=center|5:00
|Santiago, Chile
|
|-
| Win
| align=center| 8–2
| Jamie Thorton
| Submission (kimura)
| LFA 23
| 
| align=center| 2
| align=center| 2:54
| Bossier City, Louisiana, United States 
| 
|-
| Win
| align=center| 7–2
| Liz Tracy
| Decision (split)
| Invicta FC 23: Porto vs. Niedźwiedź
| 
| align=center| 3
| align=center| 5:00
| Kansas City, Missouri, United States
| 
|-
| Win
| align=center| 6–2
| Heather Bassett
| Submission (armbar)
| LFA 4
| 
| align=center| 3
| align=center| 3:40
| Bossier City, Louisiana, United States 
| 
|-
| Win
| align=center| 5–2
| Jenny Liou
| KO (punches)
| Invicta FC 21: Anderson vs. Tweet
| 
| align=center| 1
| align=center| 1:14
| Kansas City, Missouri, United States
| 
|-
| Loss
| align=center| 4–2
| Sarah D'Alelio
| Submission (rear-naked choke)
| Invicta FC 16: Hamasaki vs. Brown
| 
| align=center| 3
| align=center| 4:21
| Las Vegas, Nevada, United States
| 
|-
| Win
| align=center| 4–1
| Ariel Beck
| Submission (armbar)
| Legacy FC 49
| 
| align=center| 3
| align=center| 4:22
| Bossier City, Louisiana, United States
| 
|-
| Win
| align=center| 3–1
| Rachael Ostovich
| Verbal Submission (armbar)
| Invicta FC 14: Evinger vs. Kianzad
| 
| align=center| 3
| align=center| 4:58
| Kansas City, Missouri, United States
| 
|-
| Loss
| align=center| 2–1
| Roxanne Modafferi
| Decision (split)
| Invicta FC 10: Waterson vs. Tiburcio
| 
| align=center| 3
| align=center| 5:00
| Houston, Texas, United States
| 
|-
| Win
| align=center| 2–0
| Shannon Sinn
| Decision (unanimous)
| Invicta FC 9: Honchak vs. Hashi
| 
| align=center| 3
| align=center| 5:00
| Davenport, Iowa, United States
| 
|-
| Win
| align=center| 1–0
| Kim Colbert
| TKO (doctor stoppage)
| GFA 27: The Stage
| 
| align=center| 1
| align=center| 0:10
| Louisiana, United States
|
|-

See also
 List of current UFC fighters
 List of female mixed martial artists

References

External links
 
 

1989 births
Living people
American female mixed martial artists
Flyweight mixed martial artists
Mixed martial artists utilizing Muay Thai
Mixed martial artists utilizing Kyokushin kaikan
Mixed martial artists utilizing boxing
Mixed martial artists utilizing judo
Mixed martial artists utilizing Brazilian jiu-jitsu
Mixed martial artists from Texas
Ultimate Fighting Championship female fighters
Doping cases in mixed martial arts
American women boxers
Boxers from Texas
American female judoka
American female karateka
American female kickboxers
Kickboxers from Texas
American Muay Thai practitioners
Female Muay Thai practitioners
American practitioners of Brazilian jiu-jitsu
Female Brazilian jiu-jitsu practitioners
American sportspeople in doping cases
21st-century American women
People from Atlanta, Texas